Edin-Ådahl were a Swedish CCM band from 1977 to 1994, composed of brothers Bertil and Lasse Edin and Simon and Frank Ådahl. The group are best known for their 1990 hit "Som en vind". It won the 1990 Melodifestivalen and went on to place sixteenth at the Eurovision Song Contest. The following year, the band placed second in the Melodifestivalen. Simon Ådahl participated in 1995 together with Lasse Edin. Another song, "Revival", rose to No. 3 on Sweden's radio charts.

Their English albums had similar production quality when compared to secular albums, but also poor distribution and "lousy lyrics".

Frank Ådahl was the voice of Simba in the Swedish version of the 1994 animated film The Lion King. Two of the brothers released solo albums on Refuge in 1985. Bertil Edin released Cross the Border, and Simon Ådahl I'm In Touch. Lasse Edin formed a band called The Outsiders in 1990.

Discography

Swedish releases
Edin-Ådahl, (Prim) 1980
Alibi, (CBS/Royal) 1982
Maktfaktor, (Royal) 1983
Tecken, (Prim) 1986
Big Talk, (Royal/Cantio) 1989
Into My Soul, (Cantio) 1990
Reser Till Kärlek, (Cantio) 1991
Kosmonaut Gagarins Rapport, (Viva) 1992
Minnen: 1980—1992, (Viva) 1994
Komplett, (Media Point) 2009

English releases
Alibi, (Refuge) 1983
X-Factor, (Refuge) 1984
Miracle, (Refuge) 1987
Big Talk, (Royal Music/Refuge) (1989)
Into My Soul, (Alarma World Music) (1990)
Revival, (Alarma World Music/Cantio) (1991)

References

Musical groups established in 1977
Musical groups disestablished in 1994
Swedish musical groups
Eurovision Song Contest entrants for Sweden
Sibling musical groups
Eurovision Song Contest entrants of 1990
Melodifestivalen winners
Christian pop groups
Melodifestivalen contestants of 1990